In Italy, the polizia provinciale (Italian for 'provincial police') are the provincial-level police forces.

Functions
Each Italian province can, by statute, have its own police force. Polizia provinciale are small police organisations whose main duties are to enforce regional and national hunting and fishing laws, but they have also expanded into environmental protection.

They provide traffic police service and participate in the security services arranged by the authorities.

The forces' vehicles are usually white, with a green or blue stripe along the side. Polizia provinciale must be distinguished from questura, the office of the head of the state's police (polizia di stato) in a province, called questore (quaestor).

The polizia provinciale operate in various areas:
the fight against environmental crimes, 
the phenomenon of poaching, and against the various crimes relating to eco-mafias and zoo-mafias,
criminal exploitation of the environment and animals,
regulation of road traffic on the provincial territory or in the relevant metropolitan city.

In many provincial districts, the polizia provinciale perform road police service using dedicated equipment (alcohol tests, drug tests, mobile weighing scales, telelaser, speed cameras etc.), contributing to road traffic safety, both with prevention and repression of offences to the highway code. Furthermore, the surveillance of the roads and, through the survey, of accidents. The responsibilities of the traffic police service are extended to all types of roads.

More simply, they carry out the following police functions (in addition to the local police and the national police forces):

Judicial Police
Pursuant to art. 5 of the law of 7 March 1986, n. 65 and art. 57 co. 2 ° b) and 3 ° cpp, the polizia provinciale exercise functions and tasks of judicial police, aimed at the repression of all criminal offences within the province.

Administrative Police
The administrative police functions are carried out for all those activities to which authorization is issued.

For example, in the field of: 
derivations of public waters, 
transport, 
driving schools, 
car practice agencies, 
nautical schools, 
industrial waste water discharges, 
municipal and company purifiers, 
accesses on provincial roads, 
supervision of tourist-hotel and tourism
structures and quarrying activities, 
concessions under the competence of the province and the region (if delegated) etc.

Public Safety
The polizia provinciale can exercise 'auxiliary public security functions'. The services are carried out in aid of the various police forces (e.g. Carabinieri, Polizia di Stato, Guardia di Finanza) and consist of patrols, control points and assistance to the people of the province.

Traffic Police

Pursuant to art. 11 and 12 of the highway code, the polizia provinciale carry out traffic police services through: 
a) the prevention and verification of violations relating to road traffic; 
b) the detection of road accidents; 
c) the preparation and execution of services aimed at regulating traffic; 
d) the escort for traffic safety; 
e) the protection and control of the use of the road.

The polizia provinciale, as a traffic police body, also contribute to car and road rescue operations in general.

Environmental Police
The polizia provinciale carry out police activities for the protection of the environment in general (in compliance with the various environmental regulations and above all with the provisions of the legislative decree 3 April 2006, n. 152 and subsequent amendments and additions), with particular regard to the prevention, assessment and repression of soil, water and air pollution.

In particular:

a) mycological police for the supervision of the legislation governing the collection, cultivation, sale and marketing of mushrooms (epigean and underground);

b) forestry police aimed at the protection, protection and control of the hydrogeological constraint and the forest heritage (in some territorial areas also by regional delegation);

c) state police, for the protection of public property, in particular the river, lake and lagoon area;

d) hydraulic police  for the supervision of the hydraulic system and the protection of public waters in general;

e) mining police, regarding the supervision of the cultivation of quarries and mines.

f) building police activities are also carried out, aimed at the prevention and repression of abuses in this area.

Hunting and Fishing Police
According to the law 11 February 1992, n. 157 and the various regional laws, the polizia provinciale play a leading role in the supervision of hunting, the prevention and repression of poaching, and on the protection of wildlife.

Wildlife Police
Provincial police personnel are the main agency with regards to the control of activities of wildlife populations.

Provincial police officers are also often employed in operations of capture or killing, by order or request of the authorities, of problematic or dangerous animals, in most cases escaped from captivity, and for the recovery of animals in difficulty in difficult conditions. The provincial police are also active in the recovery of injured or distressed wildlife.

Animal Welfare Police
The polizia provinciale carry out activities aimed at the prevention, detection and repression of crimes against animals and livestock. As well as the monitoring of the welfare of animals during road transport, as well as against animal abuse.

Lake and River Police

Due to the geographic configuration of some territories, various polizia provinciale forces have special units and marine vehicles.

They are entrusted with important activities of environmental/fish/hunting protection and safeguarding, surveillance of the provincial property and surveillance of the coasts.

In addition, they provide rescue to boats and swimmers in difficulty, prevent and repress violations in nautical matters, collaboration with other police forces that perform the same service.

This service is carried out in the lakes, rivers and lagoons of many internal areas of the country, and in some cases, even the sea coasts.

Founding
The bodies (or services) were established and regulated pursuant to art. 12 of the law 7 March 1986, n. 65, in which the first paragraph provides that local authorities - in addition to municipalities - can perform the functions of local police:

"Local authorities other than municipalities carry out the functions of local police they own, also by means of special services; the provisions of the articles of this [...] law apply to these, replacing the municipality and its bodies with the local authority and the corresponding bodies."

Alongside this general provision, various state and regional laws have specific functions to be carried out by the polizia provinciale.

Generally, it has general jurisdiction over the entire territory of the province to which it belongs and, in particular, over those matters which, pursuant to Legislative Decree no. 112, were delegated by the state to the provincial body.

It can contribute, with an auxiliary function, to public order and security services. According to the law n. 65/1986, the body is constituted with a specific resolution, and must be made up of more than seven units (when the service is made up of less than seven units).

Operations

An operations centre is active at the provincial level in almost all the commands, which coordinates the management of operational activities and the personnel employed, while receiving reports. The body is equipped with various vehicles, from off-road vehicles and 4x4 cars to faster cars, mainly used in traffic police services. In many districts, different types of boats, quad-bikes, bicycles, mopeds, road motorcycles are operational.

Agents of the polizia provinciale

The selection of personnel takes place through a public competition launched by the body to which they belong, published in the official gazette of the Italian Republic.

Powers and authority
The members of the body hold the status of public official, pursuant to art. 357 of the Italian Criminal Code and art. 2700 of the Italian Civil Code.

They also hold the following qualifications and powers:

Agent or officer of the judicial police: they are agents or officers of the judicial police within the territory of the body to which they belong and during working hours, pursuant to art. 5 of the law of 7 March 1986, n. 65 and art. 57 co. 2 ° b) and co. 3 ° cpp Pursuant to art. 29 of Law 157/1992, the agents of the provincial police (agents employed by the local authority in charge of the matter), can draw up the documents, provided by the framework legislation on hunting, even outside the working hours.

Public security agent: agents who have a permanent qualification, (agents, coordination and control officers, top management) are conferred the quality of public security agent (pursuant to article 5, first paragraph, letter c) of law no. 65) when they possess the requisites required by law, at the individual request of the president of the administration to the prefect.

Personnel in possession of the status of public security officer can therefore permanently carry their service weapon, assigned to the territory of the body to which they belong - without a license and also outside working hours - in accordance with the provisions and the respective regulations. Provincial Police bodies (or services) can perform auxiliary public security functions.

Traffic police service: with permanent qualification, the provincial police units also carry out traffic police services in the territory of the body to which they belong, as provided for by articles 11 and 12 of the highway code referred to in legislative decree 30 April 1992, n. 285.

Numbers

According to the data of the Ministry of the Interior as at 31 December 2011, the staff in service amounted in total to 2,769, with the following classification:
39 agents in the role of manager;
525 agents of personnel classified in category D;
2,205 agents of personnel classified in category C.

See also
Italian police
State police (police force of sub national entities)
Law enforcement in Canada (including province-wide police forces for Ontario and Quebec)

References

External links

  Padua Polizia provinciale homepage
  Bologna Polizia provinciale homepage

Law enforcement agencies of Italy